Katrine Svane (born 17 March 1997) is a Danish football player who plays as a goalkeeper for AGF in Denmark top-division Elitedivisionen and for the Danish national under-23 team. She has also represent the Danish youth and junior teams, several times. In 2022 she was called up to the senior Denmark national team.

Honours 
Elitedivisionen
Bronze Medalist: 2019

References

External links
 Profile at the Danish Football Union
 Katrine Svane at Soccerdonna
 
 

1998 births
Living people
Danish women's footballers
Denmark women's international footballers
Women's association football midfielders
UEFA Women's Euro 2022 players
AGF Fodbold (women) players